Abderrahim Zhiou (born September 26, 1985) is a Paralympian athlete from Tunisia competing mainly in category T12 middle distance events. He is a six-time Paralympiclympic medalist, is an African record holder, and trains with the Tunisian Federation of Sports for the Disabled team based at Gabes.

Biography
Abderrahim born on 26 September 1985 in Gabes. He started the sport in 1996 aged 11, but his visual impairment was an obstacle in front of his goal to be a professional basketball player.
Two years later, he joined the Tunisian Federation of Sports for the Disabled team based at Gabes.

The international debut of Abderrahim was in an international tournament in Morocco, in 2002.

Achievements
He competed in the 2012 Summer Paralympics in London, UK. There he won 2 gold medals in the men's 800 metres and 1500 metres – T12 event, a silver medal in the men's 5000 metres — T12 event, and a bronze medal in the men's Marathon — T12 event.

In 2011, Zhiou won the World Champion title in 800, 1500, 5000 and 10000 meters T12 events.

He competed in the 2008 Summer Paralympics in Beijing, China. There he won a gold medal in the men's 800 metres — T12 event and a silver medal in the men's 10000 metres — T12, finished fourth in the men's Marathon — T12 event and finished sixth in the men's Pentathlon — P12 event.

IPC world records and memorable moment
Spain's Abel Avila seemed to have everything in control, taking the lead from the start and holding it until halfway into the second lap when Lazaro Raschid Aguilar of Cuba overtook and sped off. It looked like Aguilar had sealed the deal when suddenly 10 meters from the finish line, Tunisia's Abderrahim Zhiou stole up from behind and won in a world record-breaking 1:52.13. Aguilar settled for silver with 1:52.40, and Odair Santos of Brazil took the bronze by finishing 1:53.73. Avila finished fourth with 1:55.17.

In the 2012 Summer Paralympics in London, Abderrahim became the owner of the IPC world records in 1500 m T13 event with a timing of 3:48.31.

See also
 Tunisia at the 2012 Summer Paralympics
 Tunisia at the Paralympics

References

External links 
 

Paralympic athletes of Tunisia
Athletes (track and field) at the 2008 Summer Paralympics
Paralympic gold medalists for Tunisia
Paralympic silver medalists for Tunisia
Living people
1985 births
Medalists at the 2008 Summer Paralympics
Athletes (track and field) at the 2012 Summer Paralympics
Medalists at the 2012 Summer Paralympics
Paralympic bronze medalists for Tunisia
Tunisian male long-distance runners
Paralympic medalists in athletics (track and field)
21st-century Tunisian people